Clarkia is a genus within the flowering plant family Onagraceae.  Over 40 species are currently classified in Clarkia; almost all are native to western North America, though one species (Clarkia tenella) is native to South America.

Clarkias are typically annual herbs, growing either prostrate or erect to a height of less than 2 metres.  Their leaves are small and simple, from 1 to 10 cm in length depending on the species.  Their flowers have four sepals and four petals, usually white, pink, or red, and are often spotted or streaked. Their fruit are elongated, cylindrical pods, usually 4-grooved or 8-grooved, and when mature they hold many tiny, cubical seeds.

Several members of the genus are sometimes referred to by the common name "godetia", including Clarkia amoena, Clarkia affinis, and Clarkia lassenensis (the Lassen godetia).  This is because they were formerly classified in a genus called Godetia, which is no longer recognised since its members have been absorbed into the genus Clarkia.  Older sources may still use Godetia as a genus name.

The genus was named in honour of the explorer Captain William Clark. Unofficially, the genus is sometimes referred to as Yorkia, in honor of York, an African-American member of the Lewis and Clark Expedition.

Cultivation 
Some species are popular garden plants, for example the mountain garland, Clarkia unguiculata, the redspot clarkia, Clarkia speciosa, Farewell to Spring, Clarkia amoena and Clarkia bottae.  There are cultivated varieties of some of these species.

Ecology 
Clarkia species play important roles in their local ecosystems, as they provide habitat for native pollinators. Some pollinators even rely on Clarkia exclusively, such as the "Clarkia bee". They are also used as host plants by some species as caterpillars, such as Sphingidae moths.

Species 

Selected species
Clarkia affinis
Clarkia amoena (Farewell to Spring)
Clarkia arcuata
Clarkia australis
Clarkia biloba
Clarkia borealis
Clarkia bottae
Clarkia breweri
Clarkia concinna
Clarkia cylindrica
Clarkia davyi
Clarkia delicata
Clarkia dudleyana
Clarkia epilobioides
Clarkia exilis
Clarkia franciscana
Clarkia gracilis
Clarkia heterandra
Clarkia imbricata
Clarkia jolonensis
Clarkia lassenensis
Clarkia lewisii
Clarkia lingulata
Clarkia mildrediae
Clarkia modesta
Clarkia mosquinii
Clarkia prostrata
Clarkia pulchella
Clarkia purpurea
Clarkia rhomboidea
Clarkia rostrata
Clarkia rubicunda
Clarkia similis
Clarkia speciosa
Clarkia springvillensis
Clarkia stellata
Clarkia tembloriensis
Clarkia tenella
Clarkia unguiculata (Mountain Garland; syn. C. elegans)
Clarkia virgata
Clarkia williamsonii
Clarkia xantiana

References

External links

Jepson Manual treatment of the genus

 
Onagraceae genera